Urmila Matondkar (born 4 February 1974) is an Indian actress known for her work in Hindi cinema. She started her acting career as a child artiste in Kalyug (1980) and starred as the leading lady in the action Narsimha (1991). The successful romantic comedy Rangeela marked a turning point in her career, following which she received widespread praise for her performances, including the 1997 drama Judaai, the 1998 crime thriller Satya, the 1999 romantic comedy Khoobsurat, the 2000 thriller Jungle and the 2002 psychological romance Deewangee. She also achieved success in Telugu and Tamil cinema with starring roles in Antham (1992), Gaayam (1993), Indian (1996) and Anaganaga Oka Roju (1997). Matondkar garnered critical acclaim and commercial success with Kaun? (1999), Pyaar Tune Kya Kiya (2001), Bhoot(2003), for which she won a Filmfare Award for Best Actress (Critics), Tehzeeb (2003), Pinjar (2003), Ek Hasina Thi (2004), Naina (2005), Maine Gandhi Ko Nahin Mara (2005), Bas Ek Pal (2006) and the Marathi film Ajoba (2014). She is the recipient of numerous accolades, including a Filmfare Award, a Screen Award and a Nandi Award. She has also won an Apsara Award, three Bollywood Movie Awards and a Zee Cine Award.

Matondkar also received a special Achievement in Bollywood award at the Rajiv Gandhi Memorial Awards.

Major awards

Asia Film Cafe Awards 
The Asia Film Cafe Awards  is presented by the Bollywood film industry to honor and recognize the professional excellence of their peers. Matondkar has nomination for Best Actress  .

Apsara Film & Television Producers Guild Awards
The Apsara Film & Television Producers Guild Awards is presented by the Bollywood film industry to honor and recognize the professional excellence of their peers. Matondkar has won one award out of three nominations. All of the nominations were in the Best Actress in a Leading Role category.

Bollywood Movie Awards
The Bollywood Movie Awards were an annual film award ceremony held in Long Island, New York, United States between 1999 and 2007 celebrating films and actors from the Bollywood film industry. Matondkar was nominated three times and won each time. She has won the Most Sensational Actress award once and the Best Actress award twice.

Filmfare Awards
The Filmfare Awards are presented annually by The Times Group to honor both artistic and technical excellence of professionals in the Hindi language film industry of India. Matondkar has won one award in the Best Actress (Critics) category and received six nominations, four in the Best Actress category, one in the Best Supporting Actress which she also won and one in the Best Villain category. She became the second of the only two females to be nominated for the Best Villain category.

International Indian Film Academy Awards

The International Indian Film Academy Awards are presented annually by the International Indian Film Academy to honour both artistic and technical excellence of professionals in Bollywood, the Hindi language film industry. Matondkar has been nominated twice for the Best Actress Award.

Planet-Bollywood People's Choice Awards

Asian Network Film Awards

Stardust  Awards
The Stardust Awards is an award ceremony for Hindi movies, which is sponsored by Stardust magazine. Matondkar has received one nomination.

Star Screen Awards
The Star Screen Awards is the only award ceremony in India to be involved with the Executive Director and the Governor of the Academy of Motion Picture Arts and Sciences. They are presented annually to honor professional excellence in the Hindi language film industry of India. Matondkar has received three nominations in the Best Actress category, winning the award one time.

Zee Cine Awards
The Zee Cine Awards is an award ceremony for the Hindi film industry, now held abroad each year. Matondkar has received one award out of four nominations. She has been nominated for the Best Actor - Female category three times, winning it once.

Nandi Awards

Honours and recognitions
 Matondkar has received a special Achievement in Bollywood award at the Rajiv Gandhi Memorial Awards.

References

Matondkar, Urmila